Kaanatha Veshangal is a 1967 Indian Malayalam film, directed by M. Krishnan Nair and produced by K. P. Kottarakkara. The film stars Prem Nazir, Sheela, Sukumari and Jayabharathi in the lead roles. The film had musical score by B. A. Chidambaranath.

Cast
Prem Nazir
Sheela
Sukumari
Jayabharathi
Adoor Bhasi
G. K. Pillai
K. P. Ummer
Miss Kumari

Soundtrack
The music was composed by B. A. Chidambaranath and the lyrics were written by Vayalar Ramavarma.

References

External links
 

1967 films
1960s Malayalam-language films
Films directed by M. Krishnan Nair